Guildford railway station is a national rail station in Guildford, Surrey, England

Guildford railway station may also refer to:

 Guildford railway station, Sydney, Australia
 Guildford railway station, Perth, Western Australia
 Guildford railway station, Victoria, on the Moolort railway line, Australia

See also 
 London Road (Guildford) railway station, the other station in the town of Guildford, Surrey